The av beit din ( ʾabh bêth dîn, "chief of the court" or "chief justice"), also spelled av beis din or abh beth din and abbreviated ABD, was the second-highest-ranking member of the Sanhedrin during the Second Temple period, and served as an assistant to the Nasi (Prince). The Av Beit Din was known as the "Master of the Court;" he was considered the most learned and important of these seventy members.

Menahem the Essene served as Av Beth Din in the 1st century BCE, before abdicating to "serve the King" in 20 BCE. The House of Shammai attained complete ascendency over the Sanhedrin from 9CE until Gamaliel became Nasi in 30CE. Apparently the post of Av Beit Din was eventually filled, since the Babylonian Talmud states that Joshua ben Hananiah was Av Beit Din and Nathan the Babylonian was Av Beit Din. The Jerusalem Talmud tells the story of how Gamaliel II was deposed and Eleazar ben Azariah replaced him as Nasi. After Gamaliel was reinstated, Eleazar ben Azariah was made Av Beit Din. The parallel story in the Babylonian Talmud has Eleazar ben Azariah remaining as a co-Nasi with Gamaliel.

Modern usage
In modern times the title av beis din is often used as an honorific for the presiding rabbi of a beth din (rabbinical court), who is typically the salaried rabbi of the local Jewish community and usually a posek ("decisor" of Halakha). It is also abbreviated as AB"D when it is  after the name of the Chief Rabbi of a national Jewish community.

It can also refer to the most senior member of the court. Although the title Av Beit Din historically is higher than that of Rosh Beit Din, the rankings are sometimes reversed. The London Beth Din specifically addresses this, 
saying: "The title of Av Beth Din is formally held by the Chief Rabbi" but that "Due to his extensive workload as well as convention of his office" he's "not generally personally involved;" the court is run by the Rosh Beth Din."

 Rosh Beit Din 
In 1934, Yehezkel Abramsky was given this title. Federation of Synagogues' Yisroel Yaakov Lichtenstein used this title when he published a major response in 2009, even though he was ABD. In smaller communities, the av beth din also serves as the rosh''.

See also
 Beth din

References

Ancient Israel and Judah
Jewish courts and civil law
Orthodox rabbinic roles and titles
Sanhedrin